Rebecca Zlotowski (born 21 April 1980) is a French film director and screenwriter.

Education
A former student at prestigious Ecole Normale Supérieure, Rebecca Zlotowski received her teaching qualification in French modern literature in 2003. She graduated in 2007 at la Femis in scriptwriting section.

Career
Her first feature film, Belle Épine, is her graduation project at La Fémis, written under the guidance of her mentor Lodge Kerrigan. It was presented in competition at the 49th Critics' Week and won the Louis Delluc Prize for Best First Film in January 2011, as well as the French critics' union prize for Best First Film. Léa Seydoux was nominated for a César Award for Most Promising Actress. 

In 2013, Rebecca Zlotowski directed Grand Central starring Léa Seydoux and Tahar Rahim which premiered at the 2013 Cannes Film Festival in the Un Certain Regard section.

In 2016, Planetarium, starring Natalie Portman and Lily-Rose Depp as sisters, was released. The film screened Out of Competition at the 73rd Venice International Film Festival.

Rebecca Zlotowski's fourth film An Easy Girl premiered at the 2019 Cannes Film Festival in the Directors' Fortnight section where it won the SACD Award for Best French-language Film. 

That same year, Canal Plus premiered the series Les Sauvages, which she co-created with Sabri Louatah, the author of the novel from which the series is adapted. Rebecca Zlotowski directed all the episodes of the series. The series won best prize of the French critics union.

In 2022, here fifth film, Other Peoples Children, starring Virginie Efira, Roschdy Zem and Chiara Mastroianni is presented in competition at Venice Film Festival.

Filmography

References

External links

1980 births
Living people
French women film directors
Film directors from Paris
French women screenwriters
French screenwriters
Chevaliers of the Ordre des Arts et des Lettres
21st-century French Jews
French people of Polish-Jewish descent